The Game Changers is a 2018 documentary film about athletes who have plant-based diets. The film interviews science experts in various fields, showcases success stories of athletes that have adopted such diets, highlights favorable scientific studies, and champions what the filmmakers argue are benefits of plant-based diets for both athletes and non-athletes. It received generally positive reviews by viewers but was criticized by some nutrition, fitness, and science communication professionals for what they identified as scientific inaccuracies and a perceived unbalanced support for strictly plant-based nutrition with several accusing the film of promoting misinformation and pseudoscience.

Release
The Game Changers debuted at the Sundance Film Festival in January 2018, with a second edit released worldwide for a one-day screening in September 2019. The film has over a dozen executive producers, including James Cameron, Arnold Schwarzenegger, Pamela Anderson, Rip Esselstyn, Jackie Chan and Brendan Brazier.

Synopsis 
James Wilks is a mixed martial artist and self defense instructor. Having suffered an injury he used his downtime to explore the effects of plant-based diets on health, recovery, and athletic performance. He first explores the vegetarian diet of Roman gladiators before interviewing athletes such as Scott Jurek, Patrik Baboumian, Bryant Jennings, and Derrick Morgan who attribute their success to a plant-based diet.

Comments follow from Scott Stoll, a physician for the USA Olympic team, who argues that animal based protein impedes recovery and athletic performance due to certain inflammatory molecules and inflammatory mediators. He contrasts this with plant-based proteins that, he argues, promote gut microbial diversity, reduce inflammation, and optimize recovery and athletic performance. The film dramatizes a comparison of postprandial effects of meals consisting of animal- versus plant-based foods, purporting to show that those who ate meat showed reduced penile function and indications of endothelial dysfunction that could disrupt athletic performance. In an interview, Professor of Epidemiology and Nutrition, Walter Willett, argues that there is accumulating evidence showing that high consumption of protein from dairy sources is related to a higher risk of prostate cancer.

The next scenes criticize the meat and dairy industry for what Perry Mason, Executive Officer of the Cook County Department of Public Health, calls tactics out of the tobacco industry playbook where public relations firms such as Exponent hire researchers to create doubt to counteract public health messages. Doctor of preventative medicine David Katz says despite the appearance of confusion in the media, there is global consensus that a healthy diet is a plant-food rich diet.

A further indictment of animal agriculture comes from Bob Bailey, Research Director of Energy, Environment, and Resources at Chatham House, who says that while three quarters of all agricultural land are used for livestock production such food sources provide 34% of the protein and 18% of the calories worldwide. Animal agriculture is charged with being a main driver of deforestation and is implicated in habitat destruction and loss of biodiversity. Other scientists in the film mention other environmental impacts of animal farming including carbon dioxide emissions, the overuse of fresh water, and water pollution. Professor of Food Policy, Tim Lang, makes a closing argument that reducing meat and dairy consumption and increasing plant consumption will improve both public health and environmental health.

Having recovered from his injury, Wilks is shown teaching self defense with an additional component, what he terms "internal defense", saying that with his understanding of the benefits of plant-based diets he now has the tools to protect more lives than ever before.

Notable individuals featured

In order of appearance
 James Wilks

 Scott Jurek

 Morgan Mitchell
 Dotsie Bausch
 Kendrick Farris
 Patrik Baboumian
 Bryant Jennings

 Michael Thomas
 Griff Whalen
 Kenny Stills

 Derrick Morgan
 Caldwell Esselstyn
 Dean Ornish
 Kim Williams

 Rip Esselstyn
 Lucious Smith
 Arnold Schwarzenegger
 Walter Willett
 Richard Wrangham

 Christina Warinner
 Mark Thomas

 Jurrell Casey
 Brian Orakpo
 Tye Smith
 Wesley Woodyard
 DaQuan Jones
 Rishard Matthews

 David Katz
 Damien Mander

 Johan Rockström
 Tim Lang
 Lewis Hamilton

Reception
On Rotten Tomatoes the film has an approval rating of  based on reviews from  critics. It has been credited with influencing some viewers to shift their dietary habits towards more plant-based options, an impact that has been dubbed the "Game Changers effect". Actor Dolph Lundgren and CEO of Greggs, Roger Whiteside said they decided to follow a vegan diet after watching it. Viewing the film was accredited as an approved activity for continuing medical education (CME) credits by the Defense Health Agency, and the American College of Lifestyle Medicine offers CME credits for watching the film and passing an online quiz based on it.

Despite positive reception, the documentary was criticized by some professionals in fitness, nutrition, and science communication. For example, sports nutrition expert Asker Jeukendrup said, "Game Changers ticks almost all the boxes of pseudoscience, and none of the boxes of science" while Joe Schwarcz, director of the McGill University Office for Science and Society complained, "There is good science to be had for promoting a plant-based diet, but this film strays too much into pseudoscience for my appetite." Schwarcz criticized the film, saying "the feats of the athletes in The Game Changers cannot be considered to be proof of the benefits of a vegan diet for athletic performance". According to Schwarcz, the evidence presented "is quite flimsy", the filmmakers indulge in confirmation bias and data dredging, and "some of the research cited on behalf of veganism is funded by the organic or avocado industries".

The journal of the Hungarian Dietetic Association Új DIÉTA (New Diet) criticized the film, calling it "pseudoscience rather than real science" and "propaganda for veganism". The journal criticized the film for "one-sided research" and claims lacking in scientific basis, saying "The Game Changers only includes research that is conducive to the message they want to convey, that a vegan (plant based) diet is better in all respects than a diet containing animal-derived foods". The journal opined that it is "of paramount importance" that a documentary of this type approach the topic with scientific rigor, but "instead, the filmmakers placed more emphasis (on) eliciting emotional impact than the proper scientific background". The journal observed that "the film details at length" a consensus that vegan diet "is the most ideal" from a sustainability standpoint, however, according to a study in 2020, "it cannot be stated that the vegan diet would be the most sustainable". According to the journal, the filmmakers have numerous conflicts of interest, noting that "the speaking doctors, celebrities and professionals are all dedicated vegan activists, vegan distributors, and famous vegan fanatics like Jackie Chan or Arnold Schwarzenegger."

Mail & Guardian writer Luke Feltham criticized Wilks claim that "we are presenting the facts and letting people make their own decisions". According to Feltham, "But that's not quite true. At every turn The Game Changers does its best to instill horror at even the thought of drinking a glass of milk. The claim is that not only is all meat—not just red meat—unhealthy for you, it will also hinder your athletic performance dramatically. There's even a neat animation of your capillaries collapsing in on themselves". Feltham also perceived a number of conflict of interests among the filmmakers, saying, "it's hard to shake the sense that there is a strong agenda here." Feltham called the film "an hour-and-a-half advertisement for vegan living" and concluded that "instead of inspiring a balanced diet, The Game Changers happily goes to the other extreme".

Registered Dietetian SaVanna Shoemaker gave a mixed review for Healthline: "While a vegan diet may provide several health benefits, the film tends to overstate these claims while ignoring research on other eating patterns." Paul Kita, food and nutrition editor for Men's Health, complained of factual inaccuracies in the information presented and data taken out of context in a misleading fashion saying that the documentary "presents only one side of the facts, often via controversial sources, grand extrapolations from small studies, and statements that are flat-out misleading."

Some generally supportive reviewers also took issue with the movie's portrayal of masculinity especially as it adopts some stereotypical arguments regarding virility and the traditionally assumed connections between masculinity and strength.

In popular culture 
 On The Joe Rogan Experience November 21, 2019 podcast, Rogan and paleolithic diet proponent Chris Kresser reviewed the film. Later, Rogan hosted a debate between Kresser and The Game Changers star James Wilks.

See also 
 List of vegan media

References

External links

 
 

2018 films
American documentary films
2018 documentary films
Films directed by Louie Psihoyos
Sports nutrition
2010s English-language films
2010s American films
Documentary films about plant-food diets